Ilia is a given name and variant of Ilya.

Ilia is the name of:

People 
 Ilia II of Georgia (born 1933), current Catholicos-Patriarch of Georgia
 Ilia Abuladze (1901–1968), Georgian historian, philologist and public figure
 Ilia Averbukh (born 1973), Russian ice dancer
 Ilia Beshkov (1901–1958), Bulgarian artist, writer, and pedagogue
 Ilia Braunstein (1908–1980), Belgian philatelist
 Ilia Calderón (born 1972), Colombian journalist
 Ilia Chavchavadze (1837–1907), Georgian writer, political figure, poet, and publisher
 Ilia Chernousov (born 1986), Russian cross country skier
 Ilia Datunashvili (1937–2022), Soviet Georgian former football player
 Ilia Fibiger (1817–1867), Danish writer and playwright
 Ilia Frolov (born 1984), modern pentathlete from Russia
 Ilia Giorgadze (born 1978), Georgian artistic gymnast
 Ilia Ignatev (born 1992), Kyrgyzstani sailor
 Ilia Iljiushenok (born 1993), Russian chess International Master
 Ilia Isaev (born 1980), Russian former competitive ice dancer
 Ilia Kaikatsishvili (born 1993), Georgian rugby union player
 Ilia Kandelaki (born 1981), retired Georgian footballer
 Ilia Klimkin (born 1980), Russian former competitive figure skater
 Ilia Koshevoy (born 1991), Belarusian professional cyclist
 Ilia Kulik (born 1977), Russian figure skater
 Ilia Lekach, chief executive officer of Adrenalina
 Ilia Londaridze (born 1989), Georgian professional basketball player
 Ilia Lopez (born 1971), Female Attorney and Nonprofit Professional
 Ilia Maissuradze (born 1977), Georgian rugby union player
 Ilia Malinin (born 2004), American figure skater of Russian-Uzbekistani parentage
 Ilia Odishelidze (1865–1924), Georgian military leader
 Ilia Popov (born 1982), Russian sledge hockey player
 Ilia Shtokalov (born 1986), Russian sprint canoeist
 Ilia Shuke, former footballer and coach
 Ilia Skirda (born 2002), Russian figure skater
 Ilia Spiridonov (born 1998), Russian pair skater
Ilia Szrajbman (1907–1943), Polish Olympic freestyle swimmer
 Ilia Tkachenko (born 1986), Russian ice dancer
 Ilia Trilling (1895–1947), German-born Yiddish theatrical producer and composer
 Ilia Vekua (1907–1977), Georgian mathematician
 Ilia Vlasov (born 1995), Russian male volleyball player
 Ilia Volkov (born 1985), Russian sledge hockey player
 Ilia Volok (born 1965), Soviet-born character actor
 Ilia Xhokaxhi (1948–2007), Albanian painter, scenographer, and costume designer
 Ilia Zdanevich (1894–1975), Georgian and French writer and artist
 Ilia Zedginidze (born 1977), Georgian former rugby union player
 Ilia Zhilin (born 1985), Russian male volleyball player
 Ilia or "Julia", first wife of Roman dictator Sulla
 Iliya Dyakov (born 1963), Bulgarian former footballer
 Iliya Kushev (born 1980), Bulgarian tennis player 
 Iliya Pavlov (1960–2003), Bulgarian businessman
 Iliya Velichkov (born 1956), retired Bulgarian footballer

Characters 
 Rhea Silvia, also known as Ilia, the mother of Romulus and Remus in Roman mythology
 Ilia (Mozart), a character in Mozart's Idomeneo
 Ilia (Star Trek), a character in Star Trek: The Motion Picture
 Ilia (The Legend of Zelda), a character in The Legend of Zelda: Twilight Princess
 Ilia Amitola, a recurring character in the animated web series RWBY

See also 
 Elia (disambiguation)
 Ilia (disambiguation)
 Ilija, given name
 Ilja, given name